The Sacandaga Railroad Station is a historic train station located at 136 McKinley Avenue in the town of Northampton in Fulton County, New York. It was built in 1920 to serve Sacandaga Park and is a one-story, rectangular hipped roof wood-frame building, 125 feet by 30 feet, on a concrete slab foundation.  It features exposed rafter ends, small louvered dormers, and broad eaves in the Shingle Style. In the 1950s it was converted for use as a stable.  It is a rare surviving, non-residential building remaining from the heyday of Sacandaga Park as a resort established and served by the Fonda, Johnstown, and Gloversville Railroad.

The station was listed on the National Register of Historic Places in 2003.

See also
National Register of Historic Places listings in Fulton County, New York

References

External links

Railway stations on the National Register of Historic Places in New York (state)
Shingle Style architecture in New York (state)
Railway stations in the United States opened in 1920
1920 establishments in New York (state)
Buildings and structures in Fulton County, New York
National Register of Historic Places in Fulton County, New York
Former railway stations in New York (state)